Attorney General Saleh may refer to:

Abdul Rahman Saleh (prosecutor) (born 1941), Attorney General of Indonesia
Ismail Saleh (1926–2008), Attorney General of Indonesia